The Woman's Era was the first national newspaper published by and for black women in the United States. Originally established as a monthly Boston newspaper, it became distributed nationally in 1894 and ran until January 1897, with Josephine St. Pierre Ruffin as editor and publisher. The Woman's Era played an important role in the national African-American women's club movement.

History
In 1892, Boston activist Josephine St. Pierre Ruffin founded the Woman's Era Club, an advocacy group for black women, with the help of her daughter, Florida Ruffin Ridley, and educator Maria Louise Baldwin. It was the first black women's club in Boston, and one of the first in the country. Its members, prominent black women from the Boston area, devoted their efforts to education, women's suffrage, and race-related issues such as anti-lynching reform. Its slogan was "Help to make the world better". The Woman's Era, an illustrated monthly publication, was the club's newspaper. Ruffin served as its editor and publisher; Ridley was also an editor.

Along with articles such as "Club Gossip", "Social Etiquette", and "Health and Beauty from Exercise", the Woman's Era published news about women's suffrage in Colorado (the second state to give women the vote), interviews with activists such as Victoria Earle Matthews and Ida B. Wells, a series called "Eminent Women" that included a profile of Harriet Tubman, and criticism of other activists who disappointed them, such as Frances Willard and Albion W. Tourgée. A May 1, 1894 editorial, "How to Stop Lynching", posed this question to readers:

In his very admirable and searching address delivered in this city, April 16th, judge Albion W. Tourgee proposed as a remedy to prevent the lynching of colored people at the South, that the country where lynchings occur be compelled by law to pension the wife and children of the murdered man. This, he said would make murder costly and in self defense the local authorities would put a stop to it. At first blush, this is an attractive suggestion. But why not hang the murderers? Why make a distinction between the murderers of white men and the murderers of colored men?

The editor concluded that the only solution was for the federal government to intervene:

It can go to war, spend millions of dollars and sacrifice thousands of lives to avenge the death of a naturalized white citizen slain by a foreign government on foreign soil, but cannot spend a cent to protect a loyal, native-born colored American murdered without provocation by native or alien in Alabama. Shame on such a government! The administration in power is particeps criminis with the murderers. It can stop lynching, and until it does so, it has on its hands the innocent blood of its murdered citizens.

In 1895, Ruffin organized The First National Conference of the Colored Women of America, during which the National Federation of Afro-American Women was created. The Woman's Era became the national news outlet of the club women.

See also
 The First National Conference of the Colored Women of America
 National Association of Colored Women's Clubs

Notes

References

Further reading 
 The Woman's Era, 1894-1897 at Emory Women Writers Resource Project
 
 Gere, Anne Ruggles. Intimate Practices: Literacy and Cultural Work in U.S. Women’s Clubs, 1880-1920. Urbana: U of Illinois P, 1997. 
 Logan, Shirley Wilson. We are Coming: The Persuasive Discourse of Nineteenth Century Black Women. Carbondale: Southern Illinois UP, 1999.
 McHenry, Elizabeth. Forgotten Readers: Recovering the Lost History of African American Literary Societies. Durham: Duke UP, 2002.
 Fredlund, Katherine. "Forget the master’s tools, we will build our own house: The Woman’s Era as a rhetorical forum for the invention of African American womanhood." Peitho Journal 18.2 (2016): 67–98.

1892 establishments in Massachusetts
1897 disestablishments in Massachusetts
Defunct African-American newspapers
Monthly magazines published in the United States
Defunct women's magazines published in the United States
Magazines established in 1892
Magazines disestablished in 1897
Magazines published in Boston
Defunct newspapers published in Massachusetts
History of women in Massachusetts
African-American history of Massachusetts
Women in Boston